There are various disparate groups of wingless insects. Apterygota are a subclass of small, agile insects, distinguished from other insects by their lack of wings in the present and in their evolutionary history. They include Thysanura (silverfish and firebrats).
Some species lacking wings are members of insect orders that generally do have wings. Some do not grow wings at all, having "lost" the possibility in the remote past. Some have reduced wings that are not useful for flying. Some develop wings but shed them after they are no longer useful. Other groups of insects may have castes with wings and castes without, such as ants. Ants have alate queens and males during the mating season and wingless workers, which allows for smaller workers and more populous colonies than comparable winged wasp species.

Wingless flies
True flies are insects of the order Diptera. The name is derived from the Greek di- = two, and ptera = wings. Most insects of this order have two wings (not counting the halteres, club-like limbs which are homologous to the second pair of wings found on insects of other orders). Wingless flies are found on some islands and other isolated places. Some are parasites, resembling ticks.

Wingless flies
Chionea scita, a type of snow crane fly
Genus Badisis
Family Braulidae, or bee lice
Melophagus ovinus, or the sheep ked
Mystacinobia zelandica, the New Zealand batfly
Wingless midges
Genus Belgica, including Belgica antarctica, the Antarctic midge
Genus Pontomyia, marine flightless midges

Fly species that shed wings
Lipoptena mazamae, the Neotropical deer ked

Wingless mutant flies
Flightless fruit fly

Wingless moths
There are many species of wingless moths. Often only the females are wingless (larviform females).

Moth species having wingless females
Luffia lapidella
Operophtera fagata, the northern winter moth
Orgyia recens, the scarce vapourer 
Pachythelia villosella
Operophtera brumata, the winter moth
Many more

Flightless moths
Pringleophaga marioni, the Subantarctic caterpillar

Wingless wasps
Family Rhopalosomatidae, having winged, wingless, and reduced-wing species

Wasp species having wingless females
Family Mutillidae, with more than 3,000 species
Diamma bicolor, the blue ant (a wasp)

Others
 Family Eumastacidae, grasshoppers having many wingless species
 Family Myrmecophilidae, ant crickets
 Thinopinus pictus, the pictured rove beetle
 Order Siphonaptera, fleas, believed to have had winged ancestors
 Order Phthiraptera, lice, a wingless order under the winged superorder Exopterygota
 Family Trichogrammatidae, parasitic wasps, some species of which have wingless males that mate and die inside the host egg
 Order Notoptera

References 

Insects by adaptation
Insect morphology